Nemo Agodi (10 January 1888 – 20 January 1940) was an Italian gymnast who competed in the 1908 Summer Olympics. In 1908 he finished sixth with the Italian team in the team competition.

References

External links
 

1888 births
1940 deaths
Italian male artistic gymnasts
Olympic gymnasts of Italy
Gymnasts at the 1908 Summer Olympics